Barleycove or Barley Cove is a bay and beach in County Cork, on the south coast of Ireland. It is situated close to Mizen Head on the Mizen Peninsula, with Crookhaven or Goleen being the nearest villages.  The area surrounding Barleycove is popular during the summer months. The beach itself has been designated as one of several Special Areas of Conservation in Ireland under the European Union's Habitats Directive, due to the variety of wildlife and habitats in the sand dunes.

Origin of dunes

On 1 November 1755 there was an earthquake and tsunami recorded in Lisbon, Portugal. It was reported in the Cork Journal of 2 November 1755 that 15ft waves were experienced as a result of this event.  A side-effect of the tsunami is the dune system at Barley Cove, where much of the beach's sand was deposited by these large waves.

References

Beaches of County Cork
Tourist attractions in County Cork